"It's Alright" is a song by English boy band East 17, released in November 1993 as the sixth and last single from their debut album, Walthamstow (1993). The single version, labelled the "Guvnor mix", begins with a slow ballad-like intro for the first minute, before converting to the dance sound for the rest of the track. It reached number three on the UK Singles Chart and became a number-one hit in Australia, France, Ireland, Israel, and Switzerland. In 2011, English singer and songwriter Kim Wilde recorded a cover of the song for her 12th album, Snapshots (2011), which charted in Germany.

Critical reception
James Masterton stated in his weekly UK chart commentary, that "It's Alright" is "classic East 17", "starting mellow with a piano before launching into a hardcore dance beat." In his review of Walthamstow, Alan Jones from Music Week noted that the track "rings the changes; a reggae rollercoaster that moves from a UB40-style lead vocal through ragga and dub." On the single release, he rated it four out of five, adding, "The teen market has become somewhat more crowded since East 17's last single, but their stock is still high and this unusual track should confirm their standing behind Take That." German band Culture Beat reviewed it for Smash Hits, giving it three out of five. Tania Evans said, "I like the song, the chords are nice and the contrast where it speeds up. What they do isn't so bad."

Chart performance
In Europe, "It's Alright" peaked at number one in France, Ireland and Switzerland while reaching number two in both Germany and Lithuania. Additionally, the single was a top-10 hit in Austria, Belgium, the Netherlands, Norway and the United Kingdom, as well as on the Eurochart Hot 100, where it hit number four. In the UK, "It's Alright" peaked at number three in its seventh week on the UK Singles Chart, on 9 January 1994. The song also was a top-20 hit in Denmark and a top-30 hit in Sweden. Outside Europe, it went to number one in Australia, where it spent seven weeks in a row and ended the year as the fourth-highest-selling single. and in Israel, where the song spent five weeks on the top spot. It earned a gold record in France, a silver record in the UK, and a platinum record in Australia and Germany.

Music video
A music video was made to accompany the song, directed by Chris Clunn and Lawrence Watson. They had previously directed the video for "Slow It Down". The video begins with Brian Harvey and Tony Mortimer in a dark room, in front of a red stage curtain. Harvey sings while Mortimer plays the piano. As the rhythm kicks in, the band appears performing on a stage in front of a large crowd of young people. Different colors appear in the backdrop throughout the video, and the members of the band often performs while standing on large pyramide-like stairs. As the video nears its end, we're back with Harvey in front of the red stage curtain again. "It's Alright" received heavy rotation on MTV Europe and was A-listed on Germany's VIVA. The video was later published on London Records' official YouTube channel in September 2017, and as of December 2022, it had generated more than 17 million views.

Track listings

 CD and 7-inch single
 "It's Alright" (The Guvnor mix) – 4:43
 "It's Alright" (The Ballad mix) – 5:18

 CD maxi
 "It's Alright" (The Guvnor mix) – 4:43
 "It's Alright" (The Ballad mix) – 5:18
 "It's Alright" (Diss-cuss mix) – 6:53
 "It's Alright" (Diss-cuss dub) – 7:02
 "It's Alright" (Uncle Bob's All Strung Out mix) – 7:08

 12-inch maxi
 "It's Alright" (The Guvnor mix)
 "It's Alright" (Diss-Buss mix)
 "It's Alright" (Uncle Bob's All Strung Out mix)

 CD maxi – Remixes
 "It's Alright" (Uncle Bob's All Strung Out mix) – 7:10
 "It's Alright" (Big Boss mix) – 3:42
 "It's Alright" (Swing mix) – 3:53
 "It's Alright" (BiffCo mix) – 8:59

Charts

Weekly charts

Year-end charts

Certifications and sales

Kim Wilde version

English singer and songwriter Kim Wilde recorded a cover of "It's Alright" for 2011 for her 12th album, Snapshots (2011). It was released as a double lead single with "Sleeping Satellite", originally performed by Tasmin Archer, on 19 August 2011. A Groove Coverage remix of the song was also released, as the B-side to the album's second single, "To France".

Music video
The accompanying music video for "It's Alright" premiered on 28 July 2011 exclusively on the German website of video hosting service MyVideo. It was recorded at the Kameha Hotel in Bonn and was directed by Nikolaj Georgiew.

The video features Wilde and her band in a conference room at the hotel, where they perform the song. In between, there are segments featuring Wilde singing in other areas of the hotel.

Track listings
 CD single
 "It's Alright" (radio edit) – 3:20
 "Sleeping Satellite" (radio edit) – 3:30

 Digital download
 "It's Alright" (radio edit) – 3:20
 "Sleeping Satellite" (radio edit) – 3:30
 "It's Alright" (music video) – 3:14
 "Sleeping Satellite" (music video) – 3:33

Charts

In popular culture
The song came back to the public eye in February 2009, with the yoghurt company Müller playing "It's Alright" as the background song for their new advert. In the same year, it was featured in another advert, this time for More Th>n car insurance. In 2010, it was also used in the final montage in the series-ending episode of Big Brother's Big Mouth in the United Kingdom.

In June 2015 the song was featured in an advertisement for the mobile network 3, in which it is lip-synched by a purple puppet, made by Jim Henson's Creature Shop, named Jackson.

References

1993 singles
1994 singles
2011 singles
East 17 songs
Kim Wilde songs
Number-one singles in Australia
SNEP Top Singles number-one singles
Number-one singles in Israel
Irish Singles Chart number-one singles
Number-one singles in Switzerland
Songs written by Tony Mortimer
Song recordings produced by Richard Stannard (songwriter)
1992 songs
London Records singles